Calva Watson Wootton is one of the five founders of the national sorority Alpha Sigma Alpha.

Wootton was born in Nottoway County, Virginia to her parents, Josephine and Meredith Wastson.  Her father, Meredith, was a judge.  Wootton's family affectionately called her "Pig".  Wootton loved sports and would often go hunting with the men.

On November 15, 1901, Wootton was one of the five women who started their own sorority at Farmville State Female Normal School in Virginia.  The women started Alpha Sigma Alpha in order to live within the bonds of Greek sisterhood.  Wootton led the Alpha chapter of Alpha Sigma Alpha in her achievements in school.  She participated in campus literary societies and language clubs.  In her chapter, she served as the historian and secretary.  Wootton signed the charter for incorporation on February 13, 1903. Judge George J. Hundley, the father of founder Juliette Hundley, assisted the young women in developing the charter for incorporation.

Calva Watson Wootton graduated from the Normal School and went on to be a teacher.  She married Percy W. Wootton on April 25, 1917.  Wootton continued teaching but the Woottons never had any children of their own.

Wootton died on August 3, 1961 at the age of 75 and is buried in Blandford Cemetery in Petersburg, Virginia.

References

Year of birth missing
1961 deaths
People from Nottoway County, Virginia
Alpha Sigma Alpha
Schoolteachers from Virginia
American women educators